The BMW M50 is a straight-6 DOHC petrol engine which was produced from 1990 to 1996. It was released in the E34 520i and 525i, to replace the M20 engine.

In September 1992, the M50 was upgraded to the M50TU ("technical update"), which was BMW's first engine to use variable valve timing. Called single VANOS by BMW, the system adjusted the phasing of the intake camshaft.

The M50 began to be phased out following the introduction of the M52 engine in 1994.

The E36 M3 is powered by the S50 engine series, which is a high output version of the M50.

Design 

A significant advance over its M20 predecessor, the M50 features dual overhead camshaft (DOHC) with four valves per cylinder (the M20 has a single overhead camshaft with 2 valves per cylinder), coil-on-plug ignition, a knock sensor and a lightweight plastic intake manifold. Both engines use an iron block with an aluminum alloy head. The redline is 6,500 rpm for the M50B25 and 6,750 rpm for the M50B20 (7,000 rpm for S50 models), the same as the final version of the M20.

The location of the oil pan (sump) varies according to the model the M50 is installed in. It is in the front on the E34 5 Series (like the M20), whereas it is in the rear on the E36 3 Series.

Models

M50B20

The  M50B20 was introduced with the 1990 520i. The compression ratio is 10.5:1.

Applications:
 1990-1992 E34 520i
 1991-1992 E36 320i

M50B20TU
The M50B20 was updated with single VANOS in 1992. Peak torque became available at 4,200 rpm. The compression ratio was raised to 11.0:1.

Applications:
 1992-1994 E36 320i
 1992-1996 E34 520i

M50B24TU
This is a  engine used in the Thailand and Oceania markets. The compression ratio is 10.5:1.

Applications:
 1993-1995 E36 325iA/2.4
 1992-1996 E34 525iA/2.4

M50B25
The  M50B25 was introduced with the 1990 525i and 525ix. The compression ratio is 10.0:1.

Applications:
 1990-1992 E34 525i, 525ix
 1991-1992 E36 325i, 325is

M50B25TU
The M50B25 was updated with single VANOS in 1992, resulting in peak torque becoming available at 4,200 rpm. The compression ratio was increased to 10.5:1.

Applications:
 1993-1995 E36 325i, 325is
 1992-1996 E34 525i, 525ix

M50B30TU concept

In 1993, BMW Individual created an concept of BMW E34 530iX called Enduro Touring. Only one car was produced, having an up-sized variant of M50B25TU engine. Bore and stroke was increased and the total displacement of 3.0 was achieved.

S50

The S50 is the high performance version of the M50 which was used in the E36 M3, replacing the four-cylinder BMW S14 engine used in the E30 M3. Like the M50, the S50 has an iron block and aluminum head with four valves per cylinder.

In the United States, a less powerful engine called the "S50B30US" was used, which shares more in common with the regular M50 engine than the other S50 versions.

S50B30
The S50B30 was used in most countries, except for the United States (in 1993, BMW Canada officially imported 45 M3's with the S50B30 engine). The redline is 7,200 rpm. The S50 has an individual throttle body for each cylinder, single-VANOS (variable valve timing on the intake camshaft), Bosch Motronic M3.3 engine management and redesigned intake and exhaust systems.

The limited edition "M3 GT" model from 1995 produced . It had different camshafts and a redesigned sump and oil pump.

Applications:
 1992-1995 E36 M3 (except for U.S.)

S50B30US
In the United States, the 1994-1995 model years of the E36 M3 are powered by the S50B30US, a  engine which produces . This engine is more closely related to the standard M50 engine and has the same compression ratio as the M50B25TU, but uses a different camshafts, crankshaft, connecting rods, and pistons.

In 1996, the S50B30US was replaced by the BMW S52 engine (in the United States and Canada only).

Applications:
 1994-1995 E36 M3  (U.S. only)

S50B32
In 1995, the S50B32 replaced the S50B30 (except in Canada and the United States, where the BMW S52 engine was used instead).

The S50B32 has double-VANOS (variable valve timing on both camshafts) and a secondary oil pick-up was added. The compression ratio is 11.3:1 and the redline is 7,600 rpm. Engine management is the Siemens MSS50, with 3 knock sensors.

Applications:
 1995-1999 E36 M3 (except Canada and the United States)
 1996-2000 Z3 M Coupe and M Roadster (except Canada and the United States)

See also
 BMW engines

References

M50
Straight-six engines
Gasoline engines by model